Ruhabad may refer to various places in Iran:

Ruhabad, Kerman
Ruhabad, Zarand, Kerman Province
Ruhabad, Qazvin
Ruhabad, Khvaf, Razavi Khorasan Province
Ruhabad, Mashhad, Razavi Khorasan Province
Ruhabad, Darbqazi, Nishapur County, Razavi Khorasan Province
Ruhabad, Rivand, Nishapur County, Razavi Khorasan Province
Ruhabad, Rashtkhvar, Razavi Khorasan Province